Soame Jenyns (1 January 1704 – 18 December 1787) was an English writer and Member of Parliament. He was an early advocate of the ethical consideration of animals.

Life and work
He was the eldest son of Sir Roger Jenyns and his second wife Elizabeth Soame, daughter of Sir Peter Soame. He was born in London, and was educated at St John's College, Cambridge. In 1742, he was chosen M.P. for Cambridgeshire, in which his property (Bottisham Hall, which he inherited from his father in 1740) was situated, and he afterwards sat for the borough of Dunwich and the town of Cambridge. From 1755 to 1780 he was one of the commissioners of the Board of Trade. He was elected as a Bailiff to the board of the Bedford Level Corporation for 1748–1769 and 1771–1787.

For the measure of literary repute which he enjoyed during his life Jenyns was indebted as much to his wealth and social standing as to his accomplishments and talents, though both were considerable. His poetical works, the Art of Dancing (1727) and Miscellanies (1770), contain many passages graceful and lively though occasionally verging on licence.

The first of his prose works was his Free Inquiry into the Nature and Origin of Evil (1756). This essay was severely criticized on its appearance, especially by Samuel Johnson in the Literary Magazine. Johnson condemned the book as a slight and shallow attempt to solve one of the most difficult of moral problems. Jenyns, a gentle and amiable man in the main, was extremely irritated by his review. He put forth a second edition of his work, prefaced by a vindication, and tried to take vengeance on Johnson after his death by a sarcastic epitaph:

In 1776 Jenyns published his View of the Internal Evidence of the Christian Religion. Though at one period of his life he had affected a kind of deistic scepticism, he had now returned to orthodoxy, and there seems no reason to doubt his sincerity, questioned at the time, in defending Christianity on the ground of its total agreement with the principles of human reason. The work was praised for its literary merits.

Jenyns published Disquisitions on Several Subjects in 1782. In "Disquisition II", Jenyns argued, using the great chain of being, that animals should be viewed in the same way that humans would want to be viewed by God. He also asserted that: "We are unable to give life, and therefore ought not wantonly to take it away from the meanest insect, without sufficient reason; they all receive it from the same benevolent hand as ourselves, and have therefore an equal right to enjoy it."

Marriages

He married twice, but left no progeny:
Firstly to Mary Soame, only daughter of Col. Edmund Soame (d. 1706) of Dereham, Norfolk, a Member of Parliament for Thetford in Norfolk from 1701 to 1705, who fought for King William III. His life-size alabaster statue survives in West Dereham Church.
Secondly he married Elizabeth Grey, daughter of Henry Grey of Hackney, Middlesex.

Death and succession
Jenyns died in London of a fever, on 18 December 1787 and was buried at the church of the Holy Trinity, Bottisham. As he died without progeny, his heir was his cousin George Leonard Jenyns.

Works
A collected edition of the works of Jenyns appeared in 1790, with a biography by Charles Nalson Cole. There are several references to him in James Boswell's Johnson.

Commentary on Jenyns
Carl L. Becker describes Jenyns' take on the American Revolution in The Eve of the Revolution (1918) as follows:
Jenyns has been cited as an example of an Anglican utilitarian.

References

Attribution

External links

 Soame Jenyns at the Eighteenth-Century Poetry Archive (ECPA)

1704 births
1787 deaths
18th-century English male writers
18th-century English non-fiction writers
18th-century English poets
18th-century essayists
Alumni of St John's College, Cambridge
British male essayists
British MPs 1741–1747
British MPs 1747–1754
British MPs 1754–1761
British MPs 1761–1768
British MPs 1768–1774
British MPs 1774–1780
English animal rights scholars
English essayists
English male non-fiction writers
English male poets
Members of the Parliament of Great Britain for English constituencies
People from Bottisham
Utilitarians
Writers from London